The 2003–04 Serie B is the 72nd season since its establishment in 1929. It is the second highest football league in Italy.

This 46 matchdays championship was the longest tournament in all the history of the Italian football.

Teams
Treviso, Avellino, AlbinoLeffe and Pescara had been promoted from Serie C, while Atalanta, Piacenza, Como, and Torino had been relegated from Serie A. Following the Caso Catania, Fiorentina was added.

Events
Following the Caso Catania, the league had been expanded to 24 clubs, and six special promotions were decided to descend to 22.

Relegation play-offs were also introduced.

Final classification

Results

Promotion play-offs
Fiorentina had to play a qualification match with 15th-placed team of Serie A, Perugia.

A.C. Perugia relegated to Serie B, while ACF Fiorentina was promoted to Serie A.

Relegation play-off*

A.S. Bari was relegated but was later readmitted in place of S.S.C. Napoli.

Top scorers
 Luca Toni, Palermo: 30

Serie B seasons
2003–04 in Italian football leagues
Italy